Thargomindah Airport  is an airport near Thargomindah, Queensland, Australia.

Airlines and destinations

Services are operated under contract to the Government of Queensland and will be taken over by Regional Express Airlines from 1 January 2015.

See also
 List of airports in Queensland

References

Airports in Queensland
Shire of Bulloo